Hadler is a surname. Notable people with the surname include:

Åge Hadler (born 1944), Norwegian orienteering competitor
Audun Hadler-Olsen (born 1969), Norwegian rower
Ingrid Hadler (born 1946), Norwegian orienteering competitor
Jayden Hadler (born 1993), Australian swimmer
Loretta King Hadler (1917–2007), American actress
Mary Hadler (1902–1971), American songwriter
Tom Hadler (born 1996), English footballer

See also 
Hadler, Minnesota, is an unincorporated community in Norman County, in the U.S. state of Minnesota